Battle Anthems is a compilation album by American heavy metal band Omen. It was released in 1998 with now-defunct Greek music magazine Metal Invader issue No. 27. The album compiles songs from the first three Omen studio albums.

Track listing

Tracks 1 and 2 from Battle Cry (1984)
Tracks 3 and 4 from Warning of Danger (1985)
Tracks 5 and 6 from The Curse (1986)

Personnel
Omen
 J.D. Kimball – vocals
 Kenny Powell – guitars
 Steve Wittig – drums
 Jody Henry – bass

References

Omen (band) albums
1998 compilation albums